X Factor is an Italian television music competition to find new singing talent; the winner receives a recording contract with Sony Music. Fedez and Manuel Agnelli were confirmed as judges and mentors, as in previous seasons, Mara Maionchi returned to the panel, while singer-songwriter Levante made her debut. Alessandro Cattelan was confirmed as host. The eleventh season was aired on Thursday evenings on Sky Uno and TV8 between September and December 2017. Lorenzo Licitra won the competition and Mara Maionchi became the winning mentor for the first time. Runner-up Måneskin would later go on to win the Sanremo Music Festival 2021 and the Eurovision Song Contest 2021.

Judges' houses
The "Home Visit" is the final phase before the Live Shows. In this phase, the contestants who passed the "Bootcamp" had to perform one last time in front of their allocated judge, each in a different locations. Manuel Agnelli chose Manchester as the location for his group category and was joined by former X-Factor Italy judge and mentor Skin. At the end of this final audition, the top twelve contestants were chosen.

The eight eliminated acts were:
Boys: Domenico Arezzo, Kamless Kishnah
Girls: Francesca Giannizzari, Isaure Cassone
25+: Andrea Spigaroli, Valerio Bifulco
Groups: Ana & Carolina, The Heron Temple

Contestants and categories
Key:
 – Winner
 – Runner-up
 – Third place

Live shows

Results summary
The number of votes received by each act will be released by Sky Italia after the final.

Colour key

Live show details

Week 1 (26 October)
Celebrity performers: Ibeyi ("No Man is Big Enough for My Arms" and "River") and J-Ax ("Sconosciuti da una vita" (with Fedez))

Week 2 (2 November)
Celebrity performers: Sam Smith ("Stay with Me" and "Too Good at Goodbyes") and Dua Lipa ("New Rules")

Judges' votes to eliminate
 Agnelli: Virginia Perbellini - backed his own act, Ros
 Fedez: Virginia Perbellini - gave no reason.
 Levante: Ros - backed her own act, Virginia Perbellini
 Maionchi: Ros - could not decide so chose to take it to deadlock.

With the acts in the sing-off receiving two votes each, the result was deadlock and a new public vote commenced for 200 seconds. Virginia Perbellini was eliminated as the act with the fewest public votes.

Week 3 (9 November)
Celebrity performers: Michele Bravi ("Il diario degli errori" and "Tanto per cominciare") and Harry Styles ("Sign of the Times")

Judges' votes to eliminate
 Maionchi: Sem & Stenn - gave no reason.
 Levante: Ros - gave no reason.
 Fedez: Ros - gave no reason.
 Agnelli: Sem & Stenn - could not decide between his two acts so chose to take it to deadlock.

With the acts in the sing-off receiving two votes each, the result went to deadlock and reverted to the earlier public vote. Sem & Stenn were eliminated as the act with the fewest public votes.

Week 4 (16 November)

Celebrity performers: Afterhours ("Bianca") and Gianni Morandi ("Dobbiamo fare luce")

Judges' votes to eliminate
 Fedez: Camille Cabaltera - backed his own act, Gabriele Esposito.
 Levante: Gabriele Esposito - backed her own act, Camille Cabaltera.
 Agnelli: Camille Cabaltera - believed that Esposito had a better record path.
 Maionchi: Camille Cabaltera - felt that Esposito had more potential.

Week 5 (23 November)

Theme: Previously unreleased songs (Round 1), Artists top sellers (Round 2)
Celebrity performers: Negramaro ("Solo 3 minuti"/"Estate"/"L'immenso"/"Nuvole e lenzuola" (with the contestants) and "Fino all'Imbrunire")

Judges' votes to eliminate
 Fedez: Rita Bellanza - backed his own act, Gabriele Esposito.
 Levante: Gabriele Esposito - backed her own act, Rita Bellanza.
 Agnelli: Gabriele Esposito - believed that Bellanza had more potential.
 Maionchi: Gabriele Esposito - thought that Bellanza's performances were the best.

Week 6: Quarter-final (30 November)

Celebrity performer: Noel Gallagher's High Flying Birds ("Don't Look Back in Anger" and "Holy Mountain") 

Judge's vote to eliminate
 Agnelli: Andrea Radice - backed his own act, Ros.
 Maionchi: Ros - backed her own act, Andrea Radice.
 Levante: Andrea Radice - recognized the improvement in Ros.
 Fedez: Andrea Radice - felt that Ros had more potential.

Week 7: Semi-final (7 December)

Judges' vote to eliminate
 Agnelli: Samuel Storm - backed his own act, Ros.
 Fedez: Ros - backed his own act, Samuel Storm.
 Levante: Ros - found Storm's vocals more interesting.
 Maionchi: Ros - gave no reason.

Week 8: Final (14 December)
Celebrity guest artists:  James Arthur (duet with each finalist), Tiziano Ferro, Ed Sheeran.

References

External links
 X Factor Italia

2017 Italian television seasons
Italian music television series
Italy 11
X Factor (Italian TV series)